Bisma Karisma (born November 27, 1990 in Bandung) Bisma is well known as a member of boy band SM*SH. Before joining SM*SH, was a national Bboy and also a drummer, percussionist and vocalist. With SM*SH Bisma has released two albums and has achieved more than forty achievement. Their first album was awarded Platinum for being sold for more than one million copies within six-month.
In mid 2014 Bisma begin his solo career with the first single "#LAKUKANLAH", he composed and write the song by himself. He also appeared in television soap opera, Cinta Cenat Cenut, along with his bandmates SM*SH, in 2016, he has become the co-producer, original soundtrack writer and singer, as well as the main cast of JUARA.

Early life

Bisma was born in Bandung, West Java to Karyana Sugiharta, an Indonesian Air Force, and Ati Casmawati. He has an older sister Mega Puspita Sari, a pharmacist. When he was ten years old, he joined Dance Dance Revolution Competition and within a year he finally came out as the first winner of the national competition. At the age of eleven, he started his path in breakdance by joining DAWN SQUAD a famous breakdance team from Bandung. He was given MURI Achievement as a longest head spinner.
 
He has grown his interest in playing instrument since he was invited on stage by COKLAT when he was in elementary school, he also was raised in local indie musician society in bandung, one of them is Aska Pratama from Rocket Rockers whom he considers as a relative. He was performing in an indie-rock band and a Motown band as well.

Music career

Bisma started his professional dance career during his high school times and as a visual communication design college student he formed a band with his childhood friends. They performed regularly in some cafes, art stages, and big events. In 2009 his senior choreographer Geri Krisdianto offered him to join for a new boy band in Indonesia. Bisma and the other six members was trained for six-month before their debut on October 10, 2010 with the song titled "I Heart You". SM*SH has taken Bisma to reaching his stardom. November 2014 Bisma produced a song titled Lakukanlah as his solo debut under MDG Production. Following the success of his first single he produced Cukup with Widi Purwadireja of Maliq & d’essentials and co-writer Sheryl Sheinafia. He wrote Pemeran Pengganti for JUARA original soundtrack and the song became top charts in many radio station.

Acting career

Bisma acting career begin when he acted in the television soap opera Cinta Cenat Cenut together with SM*SH. The series became a success, resulting in TRANS TV producing it for 3 seasons. In 2014 Bisma played the main role in ABG Jadi Manten, a television soap opera aired on SCTV. 
 
1 year later, Bisma worked along with MagMA Entertainment to produce a drama-action movie titled JUARA (Champion). In this movie he had a role as the co-producer, original soundtrack singer-songwriter, and main cast, where he acted with some senior actors such as Cut Mini Teo, Tora Sudiro, Cecep Arif Rahman (The Raid 2 villain cast). He won many awards as Best New Actor for his role in JUARA The Movie. His next movie project is SILARIANG a movie that highlights elopement and Bugis culture.

Discography

As SM*SH member 
 "I Heart You" (2010)
 "Senyum Semangat" (2011)
 "Ada Cinta" (2011)
 "Akhiri Saja" (2011)
 "Selalu Bersama" (2011)
 "Pahat hati" (2013)
 "Rindu Ini" (2013)
 "Selalu Tentang Kamu" (2013)
 "Hello" (2014)
 "Story of My Life"/"Unconditionally" (One Direction/Katy Perry cover) (2014)
 "Terhebat" (Coboy Junior cover) (2014)
 "Fortune Cookie" (JKT48 cover) (2014)
 "#Lakukanlah" (2015)
 "Thinking Out Loud" (Ed Sheeran cover) (2015)
 "Cukup" (2015)
 "Pemeran Pengganti" (2016)

TV Shows 
 SMASH Ngabuburit (season 1) Host
 SMASH Ngabuburit (season 2) Host
 Dahsyat (2015–present) Host

Soap Opera 
 "Cinta Cenat Cenut" (2011) as Bisma Rusdiantoro
 "Cinta Cenat Cenut 2" (2011) as Bisma Rusdiantoro
 "Cinta Cenat Cenut 3" (2012) as Bisma Rusdiantoro
 "ABG Jadi Manten" (2014) as Bisma

Movie 
 "Juara" (2016) as Bisma

References

External links 
 
 
 

Living people
1990 births
Indonesian dance musicians
21st-century Indonesian male singers
Indonesian male television actors
Indonesian pop singers
Indonesian rhythm and blues singers
People from Bandung
Sundanese people